Kings Park, (Noongar: Kaarta Gar-up) is a  park overlooking Perth Water and the central business district of Perth, Western Australia.

The park is a mixture of grassed parkland, botanical gardens and natural bushland on Mount Eliza with two-thirds of the grounds conserved as native bushland. Offering panoramic views of the Swan River and Darling Range, it is home to over 324 native plant varieties, 215 known indigenous fungi species and 80 bird species.

It is the most popular visitor destination in Western Australia, being visited by over five million people each year.

Besides tourist facilities, Kings Park contains the State War Memorial, the Royal Kings Park Tennis club and a reservoir. The streets are tree lined with individual plaques dedicated by family members to Western Australian service men and women who died in World War I and World War II. The park is also rich in flora (both native and introduced) and during September of each year Kings Park hosts Australia's largest wildflower show and exhibition – the Kings Park Festival.

The park is an unincorporated area outside all local government areas; it is administered by the Botanic Gardens and Parks Authority, which is a state government authority.

History

Prior to European settlement and exploration Mount Eliza was known as Mooro Katta and Kaarta Gar-up, the Aboriginal names given by the Nyoongar inhabitants. The area has been an important ceremonial and cultural place for the Whadjuk tribe who had campsites and hunting grounds in the area.

In the 1880s Kings Park was used by the Perth section of the Volunteer Rifle Corps (a civilian militia) for shooting.

At the base of the southern face is a freshwater spring, known as Kennedy Spring (Goonininup), which provided year-round water for the native inhabitants. The spring was noted by the first European visitors to the area, Willem de Vlamingh's party, on 11 January 1697. The Lieutenant Governor of the Swan River Colony, James Stirling, chose the townsite of Perth for this reason – the only local spring. He named the area Mount Eliza for Mrs Ralph Darling.

The Colony's first Surveyor General John Septimus Roe recognised the qualities of the area and tried to protect it, by identifying the land to be set aside for public purposes. By 1835 Roe's protection was overturned and the first shipment of five tonnes of jarrah was cut on Mount Eliza, becoming the colony's first export. Logging in the area continued until 1871 when Roe's successor Malcolm Fraser persuaded the then Governor Weld to set aside  as public reserve.

Officially opened on 10 August 1895, the park was originally called Perth Park and was renamed in 1901 to King's Parkthe apostrophe was later dropped. This was to mark the ascension to the British throne of King Edward VII and the visit to Perth of George, the Duke of Cornwall and Princess Mary. One of the major roads through the park, May Drive is named in the Princess's honour. Forrest planted the first tree, a Norfolk Island Pine (Araucaria heterophylla), and other trees were introduced to the site, Eucalyptus ficifolia and exotic species of Pinus; few of these were successful due to lack of irrigation.

The Mount Eliza reservoir provided water to the local area, and still remains, but by arrangement of the lease was partly diverted for use in the park itself. This was largely allocated, after 1919, to the memorial Oaks and Planes lining May Drive. Their eventual failure led to their substitution with Bangalay, Eucalyptus botryoides, and Eucalyptus calophylla var. rosea.

Attempts to situate an Olympic-size swimming pool on bushland in Kings Park led to the establishment in 1956 of a Citizens’ Committee for the Preservation of Kings Park, which successfully campaigned to prevent the proposal from going ahead.

Since 1999, Kings Park has been administered by the Botanic Gardens and Parks Authority (BGPA), who also administer Bold Park, and does not come under any local government authority. The park's administration building contains all the administrative offices where visitors may book guided walking tours, get information, or reserve one of the facilities.

Kings Park was featured in 2006 on the American reality TV show The Amazing Race 9 as well as in 2011 on the Australian franchise The Amazing Race Australia 1, where teams collected a clue from in front of the War Memorial.

In early 2009, the south western area of the park was severely damaged by a fire, which has been suspected to have been deliberately lit.

The Elizabeth Quay redevelopment plans include a cable car to Kings Park, although construction is not in scope for the initial phase.

Panoramas

Memorials

War Memorial

The State War Memorial Precinct is located on Mount Eliza overlooking Perth Water. It comprises the Cenotaph, Court of Contemplation, Flame of Remembrance and Pool of Reflection. The Anzac Day dawn service is held at 5:30 am on 25 April each year and is attended by more than  people. There is also an official service held at 11 am on 11 November for Remembrance Day.

The Cenotaph was unveiled in the year of the Centenary of Western Australia – on 24 November 1929 by the Governor Sir William Campion, and had as the honorary architect General Sir J. Talbot Hobbs. The court of contemplation is at the western side of the precinct and was unveiled on 6 November 1955 by Sir Charles Gairdner. The flame of remembrance and pool of reflection was inaugurated by Queen Elizabeth II on 1 April 2000.

Underneath the Cenotaph is the roll of honour with the names of all servicemen and women who enlisted in Western Australia to die in the Boer War, World War I, World War II, Korean War or Vietnam. In 2012, after some controversy the names of service personnel who died in Iraq and Afghanistan were inscribed on the wall. In addition, below the memorial is one of the entrances to the tunnels that are below Kings Park. These are not accessible to the public.

Distributed throughout the park are more specific memorials to various battles, military units, prisoners of war and other groups.

Honour Avenues

Originally proposed by Mr Arthur Lovekin, owner of the Daily News, the idea was based on the Avenue of Honour in Ballarat, Victoria. Originally families were required to pay 10 shillings to cover the cost of the plantings; ex-servicemen provided the necessary labour to plant the trees. In 1920 Lovekin and board member Sir William Loton each donated 500 pounds to clear and plant Forrest Avenue with Sugar Gums. After Lovekin died the Kings Park board renamed Forrest Avenue to Lovekin Drive. Kings Park now has three tree-lined avenues set aside to honour service personnel who died in the two World Wars and other engagements: May Drive, Lovekin Drive and the most recent addition - Marri Walk.

Fraser Avenue

Originally planted with Red-flowering gums Corymbia ficifolia in 1898 to celebrate Queen Victoria's Jubilee, and added to in 1929 to celebrate the State Centenary – the gums were affected by patch canker disease in the 1930s. It was in 1938 that the Lemon Scented Gum trees Corymbia citriodora now line the avenue are to honour the dignitaries and members of the Western Australia Centenary organising Committee, who on 29 September 1929 planted the trees.

Bali Memorial
This memorial is dedicated to the 16 Western Australian victims, the injured and those who helped the survivors of the Bali bombings on 12 October 2002 in the resort town of Kuta on the Indonesian island of Bali, where 202 people were killed and 209 injured. The majority of the dead were foreign tourists, including 88 Australians.

Edith Dircksey Cowan Memorial
The Edith Dircksey Cowan Memorial, formerly known as the Edith Cowan Memorial Clock, is the clock tower at the main entrance to Kings Park. It was built in 1934 as a memorial to Edith Cowan, the first woman elected to an Australian parliament. The committee responsible for the memorial had intended  that a memorial be built in the Park, but the Kings Park Board declined the request.

Botanic Garden

The botanic garden is an  site within the park. Currently known as the Western Australian Botanic Garden it has a collection of  species of Western Australian flora on display. WA Botanic Garden is part of the worldwide network of botanic gardens committed to plant conservation. The garden was designed by John Oldham, who held the position of Government Landscape Architect at the time. It was established to showcase the flora of Western Australia to those visiting Perth for the 1962 British Empire and Commonwealth Games, although the official opening did not take place until 4 October 1965.
Botanic Garden is today home to over half of Australia's  plant species and the following popular landmarks:	
 Conservation Garden
 Gija Jumulu Boab Tree
 Pioneer Women's Memorial Fountain and Water Garden
 Centenary of Western Australian Women's Suffrage Memorial
 Lotterywest Federation Walkway

Science
The Science Directorate within the Botanic Gardens and Parks Authority is renowned for its research and scientific works, specialising in conservation and restoration of native species and ecosystems. The directorate is categorised into specific scientific areas including restoration ecology, seed science, conservation genetics, propagation science and orchid science, which are supported by many accredited research scientists and students.

Kings Park Festival
Beginning in 1965, the Kings Park Festival has grown to a month-long celebration of floral displays, live music, exhibitions, workshops, interpretive artworks, guided walks and family activities throughout September. Held to promote the beauty of Western Australia's native wildflowers, the event now attracts over  people including gardening enthusiasts, families, school students, artists, seniors and fashion lovers.

May Drive Parkland

The May Drive (formerly Synergy) Parkland is one of two children's playgrounds in Kings Park, the other being the Ivey Watson Playground. It includes a lake and island, play and climbing equipment for children, and life-sized model dinosaurs. It was formerly sponsored by Western Australian power company, Synergy.

The Vietnam War memorial and Zamia café are located in the Synergy Parkland.

Lotterywest Family Area
This popular playground for young families is specifically targeted for children aged under five to encourage strong early childhood development. It was extensively refurbished in 2006 with funding from Lotterywest.

Aboriginal Art Gallery
The Aboriginal Art Gallery is a retail outlet on Fraser Avenue that exhibits the works of Aboriginal artists from Western Australia and the Northern Territory.

DNA Tower

Its design resembles the deoxyribonucleic acid (DNA) molecule. The paving below the DNA Tower is made with stones sent from 11 towns and 80 shires in Western Australia.

Royal King's Park Tennis Club

Jacob's Ladder
Jacob's Ladder is a set of stairs located at the end of Cliff Street, in the close proximity to Kings Park, though it is not part of the park. It has 242 steps and leads down to Mounts Bay Road. The Ladder is a popular site for Perth residents to exercise, with many people using it in the mornings and on lunch breaks.

The staircase was closed after being damaged by a landslide during a storm on 22 March 2010, and re-opened on 21 June 2010, after repairs.

Walks

Law Walk

Law Walk is Kings Park's premier urban bushland trail. It is a  loop walk that begins at Rotunda Two and continues along the ridge of the limestone escarpment to Dryandra Lookout. A loop in the trail then leads to the Lotterywest Federation Walkway and back to the start of Law Walk, taking visitors approximately 45 minutes to complete.

The Kokoda Track

Guided walks
Founded in 1984, the Kings Park Guides are a group of volunteers that lead guided walks all year round and help staff the Visitor Information Centre. Twice daily the guides provide guided walking tours of the monuments and memorials, bushland paths and the Botanic Garden.

The guides cover all aspects of the park including the local Noongar names and traditions.  Walks are varied according to the Noongar season: Djilba-Kambarang (July–October) for the wildflower season, the Mukuru for May and June, and the Birak-Djeran for November–April.

Volunteers and community involvement
The Friends of Kings Park was established in 1993 to promote community involvement and commitment within Kings Park and Botanic Garden.

The Kings Park Volunteer Master Gardeners provide a free garden advisory service to the community and offer free advice on anything from propagation and potting to planting out and pests.

In 1922, the West Perth sub branch of the Returned Services League (RSL) became responsible for the maintenance and preservation of the plaques along Kings Park's Honour Avenues. Today they are known as the Honour Avenues Group.

See also 
 List of public art in Kings Park

Notes

References 
 Coy, Neil. [400 oaks were planted along May Drive in 1919 – only one survives] For people and plants, Winter 1993, p. 1.

External links 

Heritage Icons: Kings Park
Friends of Kings Park

 
Parks in Perth, Western Australia
Botanical gardens in Western Australia
Gardens in Western Australia
1895 establishments in Australia
Australian military memorials
Centenary of Western Australia
Tourist attractions in Perth, Western Australia
1962 British Empire and Commonwealth Games venues